De Adelaarshorst is a multi-use stadium in Deventer, Netherlands.  It is currently used mostly for football matches and is the home stadium of Go Ahead Eagles. The stadium is able to hold 10,400 people and was built in 1920.

The stadium hosted a qualifying match for the 1974 FIFA World Cup between the Netherlands and Iceland (who were nominally hosting the match). The Dutch won the game 8–1.

References

  VoetbalStats

Football venues in the Netherlands
Sports venues in Overijssel
Go Ahead Eagles
Buildings and structures in Deventer
Sports venues completed in 1920
UEFA Women's Euro 2017 venues